Portsmouth Women, formerly known as "Portsmouth Ladies", is a women's football club for the south coast city of Portsmouth in Hampshire, England. Their male counterparts are Portsmouth F.C.

Past

Early years

Portsmouth Football Club Ladies was formed in 1987, at a time when women's football was in its infancy and consequently the only option was for the team to play in the Southern Region League.

The club entered the league in 1988 where they enjoyed 10 good seasons. During this period the club started introducing Youth teams to compete at a local level.

In 1998, ten years after the team first entered the English women's league system, Portsmouth F.C. Ladies gained promotion into the South West Combination League and in the same season won the South West Combination League Cup.

Portsmouth F.C. Ladies became the first women's club in Hampshire to receive the F.A. Charter Standard Club Award for excellence in provision of coaching and support staff in 2002. After having finished runners up in the 2000/2001 and 2001/2002 seasons, in the 2002/2003 season Portsmouth demonstrated the impact of this excellence in coaching as the team won the South West Combination League in a convincing manner, dropping only 2 points during the course of the entire season, to gain promotion into the Premier League Southern Division for the first time.

Premier League Southern Division

The 2003/2004 season saw The First Team maintain their status in the Premier League Southern Division while in the same season Portsmouth F.C. Ladies reserve team won the Premier League Reserves Southern Division Two to gain promotion into Division One. The following season, Portsmouth F.C. Ladies retained the Hampshire Cup after beating local rivals Southampton 3–0 in the final.

The following season, Portsmouth finished the league in second place, finishing just eight points behind Chelsea. For the next few seasons, Portsmouth consolidated their position in the Premier League Southern Division, finishing comfortably mid-table. During the next few seasons, Portsmouth didn't finish lower than fourth place.

During the 2010/11 season, Pompey finished in fourth place in the league but reached the Semi-Finals of the League Cup where Pompey fell to a narrow 2–1 defeat against eventual winners Barnet. This cup run included a 2–1 victory over Premier League National Division side and league winners Sunderland.

In 2012, Pompey secured the Women's Premier League Southern Division title and promotion to the National Division for the first time in their history in their penultimate match of the season, a 2–1 win over Plymouth. At kick-off Portsmouth's promotion rivals Colchester and West Ham had played all their fixtures while Portsmouth had two games left of their season. Needing a win to guarantee the league title, Portsmouth fell behind to a Plymouth goal midway through the second half. However two goals in the last 20 minutes secured the league title for Portsmouth, who were presented with the trophy at their final match in London. Portsmouth brought the curtain down on their most successful season with a 4–1 win at Queens Park Rangers. QPR welcomed the champions with a guard of honour as the Blues ran onto the pitch prior to kick-off.

Premier League National Division

Pompey faced a tough Premiership National division debut with an away tie against the previous season's double winners Sunderland who also eventually ended up winning the 2012/2013 Premier League National Division title. Pompey's first win in the National Division came in a home tie against Aston Villa at Moneyfields, following a 3–0 win in their second game of the season. This was followed by a 3–2 win against Manchester City, with the winner coming in stoppage time.

In the cups, Pompey reached the Fourth Round of the FA Cup following a comprehensive 5–0 victory against QPR at Westleigh Park before falling to defeat away at Yeovil Town. In the League Cup, Pompey finished second in their group and faced Manchester City in the round of sixteen. Pompey won 2–1 at Westleigh Park in front of a large crowd. In the Quarter-Finals, Pompey defeated Barnet 2–1 but Pompey's league cup run came to an end at the Semi-Final stage once again, losing to eventual winners Aston Villa. Following Pompey's last home again against Leeds United, it was announced that manager Vanessa Raynbird would be stepping down as manager to take up a director of football role while Perry Northeast and Katie Poore would become joint managers. The 2012/13 seasons also saw Pompey taking part in the bidding process, alongside 29 other teams around the country, to join the expanded [Women's Super League].

Back to the Southern Division

Following the reorganisation of the English women's football league structure with the expansion of the Women's Super League, Portsmouth found themselves back in the Premier League Southern Division for the 2013/2014 season, the third tier of English women's football, however with the two leagues above this forming the first and second division of the Women's Super League, there was no longer the opportunity to be promoted from this league. Pompey's first match back in the Premier League Southern Division was a comprehensive 3–1 victory against Premier League debutants Chesham United. Pompey also played their first ever game against Lewes Ladies.

In December of that season, Pompey Ladies made their Fratton Park début. While having been in existence for over 20 years, the club had never previously at Fratton Park and this demonstrated the increased co-operation between the men's and ladies' section of Portsmouth FC. In front of a record-breaking crowd for the Blues, Pompey fell to a 2–1 defeat, however despite the result, the match was significant for what it represented off the pitch.

The second half of the season saw Pompey Ladies in blistering form, with the Blues winning seven consecutive matches to climb from mid-table to challenge for the title. Eventually, the Blues' winning run was ended by Cardiff City, who themselves had only lost one game all season (an early season fixture against Portsmouth). Nevertheless, the Blues finished a credible fourth place in the league, an impressive outcome after having lost a number of first team players to the Super League.

The 2013/14 season also presented Pompey Ladies' best ever run in the FA Women's Cup. Entering in the 2nd round, the Blues comfortably saw off Keynsham Town and Lewes before travelling to Crystal Palace of the South East Combination League, who themselves had caused an upset by defeating Premier League side Derby County. The Blues were handed a home tie to WSL 2 side Durham WFC in the 5th round of the cup. A brilliant team performance saw the Blues secure a 2–1 victory against their higher league opponents with the winner by Charley Wilson coming deep into stoppage time. Pompey were through to Quarter-Final of the FA Women's Cup for the first time in their history and were the last remaining team outside of the WSL 1. The Blues were again handed a home tie against Notts County, who were top of the WSL1 at the time of the match. Pompey held Notts County for 70 minutes before goals from England internationals Jess Clarke and Sophie Bradley secured a 2–0 win for the Super League side.

Aside from the FA Women's Cup, Portsmouth Ladies retained both the Hampshire Cup, following a 6–0 win over Gosport Borough, and the Portsmouth Cup.

This season also saw live radio commentary for the first time provided by Express FM's Grassroots Football Show and later by South Coast Sports Radio.

Portsmouth regain the Southern Division Title

The 2014/15 Women's Premier League Southern Division began with an inauspicious start for Portsmouth FC Ladies as the side fell to a 7–3 defeat at home to Cardiff City, after Lucy Quinn was sent off for handling the ball, a decision that was later overturned. However, blistering form in the league which saw the Hampshire side go undefeated for several months, meant Portsmouth Ladies were challenging for the title. By March this had turned into a four-horse race between Portsmouth, Brighton, Charlton and Cardiff City but by the end of the season, the title was between Portsmouth and Brighton. With just two games left of the season, Portsmouth needed four points to secure the title though Pompey won them both, sealing the Women's Premier League Southern Division title with a victory at home in front of a large crowd. This marked Portsmouth's second league title in four seasons. However, they lost the promotion play off against the Northern League Winners, Sheffield F.C. Ladies after a goal in the 90th minute separated the teams. It was played in neutral at The DCS Stadium, home of Southern Football League Premier Division side Stratford Town F.C.

Portsmouth also retained the Hampshire Cup with a 4–1 win against local rivals Southampton Saints. With this match being the first meeting between Portsmouth and Southampton in women's or men's football since 2011, a large crowd was present to watch Portsmouth Ladies secure their ninth Hampshire Cup.

The 2014/15 season was also significant for the Blues as Ini Umotong became the first ever Portsmouth Ladies player to be capped at international senior level when she made her debut for Nigeria in a 2–2 draw against Mali. Ini Umotong was later called up for the Nigeria Women's World Cup squad but was an unused substitute in all three of the Super Falcons group games.

After the departure of Perry Northeast, Portsmouth Ladies appointed former Watford Development Coach Craig Taylor for the start of the 2016/17 season. After a mixed start of results, including an emphatic 8–2 cup victory over Lowestoft Town and disappointing defeats to Basildon & Swindon, Taylor decided to step down only 4 months into his new role. Former assistant manager Jay Sadler, brought to the club by Taylor, is currently in temporary charge. His reign began with a resounding 5–0 win at home to Swindon Town.

2017–2018 season 

The season marked the start of a transitional period for Portsmouth Ladies. The full-time appointment of Jay Sadler, after the sudden departure of Craig Taylor, was met with a host of summer signings and departures, as the new first team manager looked to implement his own unique style of football at the club. "I always look to play a creative and expansive, possession-based, attacking style of football. The aim is to gain numerical and positional superiority, wherever we are on the pitch. This allows us to not only defend as a unit but to penetrate the opposition defensive lines and create goal scoring opportunities consistently for a 90-minute period".

The first game of the season was an emphatic 4–1 home win against Cardiff City Ladies. This was followed a week later by a dominant performance against Coventry United Ladies, in which Portsmouth left victorious with a 2–1 away win. Mixed results followed; consecutive last-minute losses against Charlton Athletic Women and Lewes FC Women preceded a hard-fought draw in the local derby against Chichester City Ladies, before a stoppage-time penalty game Portsmouth Ladies all the points at home to West Ham. They also lost the reverse fixture against Chichester, Jenna Fowlie grabbing the winner as Portsmouth lost 3–2 at Oaklands Park.

November to February saw another difficult period for Portsmouth Ladies. The retirement of all-time record goalscorer, appearance maker and the first female inductee to the Portsmouth FC hall of fame, Gemma Hillier resulted in a slight upheaval of the squad. First team players Natasha Stephens, Emily Paines and Jade Widdowson (who moved to Chichester City ladies, Southampton Women and Southampton G&L FC, respectively) decided to leave, whilst club captain Nadine Bazan decided to retire following disagreements with the manager. The club also said goodbye to influential midfielder Molly Clark, who transferred to West Ham United Ladies to join them in their hunt for Women's Super League status.

Despite the issues off the pitch, Portsmouth Ladies managed to put together an impressive run of 8 wins from 10 games across all competitions. The most impressive being a 90-minute battle against WSL applicants Lewes FC Women that saw Portsmouth Ladies come from behind to win 3–2 in one of the most impressive displays of the season.

The cancellations of multiple games in March made it difficult for Portsmouth Ladies to carry on their form, with only one game against Crystal Palace resulting in a 4–0 loss as Portsmouth struggled to shake off the cobwebs after nearly 6-weeks with no fixture. However, the first day of April saw them run out 5–0 winners at home to a young and resolute Swindon Town Ladies.

Portsmouth Ladies are currently sitting 5th in the league table and have a Hampshire Cup final to look forward to as they go in search of 'La Decima', their tenth Hampshire cup title.

Academy and youth system 

In 2000 Portsmouth F.C. Women officially introduced a Youth Structure within the club, catering for U14 and U12 teams.

Since being introduced, this has continued to expand and now the club has programmes allowing girls and women of all ages to participate in football. In 2005 they became only the second women's club in Britain to establish a Football Academy for females.

For the 2014/15 season, an U18 side was introduced to bridge the gap between the U16 team, which was currently the eldest youth team level, and the senior teams (including both the reserves and the first teams), allowing a clear pathway for players coming up Portsmouth FC Ladies' youth ranks. This new U18 team competed in the newly formed Hampshire U18 League along with other local sides.

However, the youth section was soon transferred over to Pompey in the Community where it operates to this day.  To date Pompey's youth system have produced three notable first team players in Mia Adaway, Freya Jones  and Jess Smith

Stadium 

Portsmouth F.C. Women have played in a number of different stadiums throughout their history. Currently, Portsmouth the majority of their home games at Privett Park, the home of National League South side, Gosport Borough F.C. Prior to this, Pompey played at the Moneyfields Sports Ground, the home ground of Wessex League Premier Division side Moneyfields FC. The team have also in recent seasons played at The City Ground, home of Southern League Division One South & West side Winchester City.

In the Fourth Round of the 2012/13 FA Cup, Portsmouth played their home tie against QPR at West Leigh Park. Subsequently, this stadium was announced as the home venue for the rest of the season, although the last two home games were played at the College Ground, home of Hayling United FC, as a result of the overrunning of the season due to bad weather and the pitch at Westleigh Park being relaid. Westleigh Park continued to be used as Pompey Ladies' main home ground for the first half of the following season, however poor weather over the New Year period saw Pompey Ladies relocate, with the Blues playing most of the second half of the season at Privett Park, home of Conference South side Gosport Borough, where as of 2016, they still play.

In the 2018/19 season, the team secured a deal with local side Baffins Milton Rovers to ground share their PMC stadium for home games.

From the start of the 2020/21 season Portsmouth agreed a deal with local side Havant and Waterlooville to use their new artificial pitch to train and play their home games on.

Upon its completion Portsmouth Women will use the new John Jenkins stadium as their home ground.

Players

Current squad

Updated 19 January 2023

Staff

Former Super League players
This is a list of former Portsmouth FC Women players who have or still play in the FA Women's Super League.

(Former Super League player)
(Former Super League player)
(Former Super League Player)

Notable honours 
FA Women's Premier League Southern Division
Winners: (2) 2011–12 , 2014–15
 Runners-up: (2) 2004–5, 2006–07

South West Combination Women's Football League
 Winners: (1) 2002–03
 Runners-up: (2) 2000–01, 2001–02

South West Combination League Cup
 Winners: (1) 2002–03

Hampshire Cup
 Winners: (15) 2004–05, 2006–07, 2008–09, 2009–10, 2010–11, 2011–12, 2012–2013, 2013–2014, 2014–15, 2015–16, 2016–17, 2017–18, 2018–19, 2019–20, 2021-22 

Portsmouth Divisional Football Association Cup
 Winners: (4) 2018-19, 2019-20, 2020-21, 2021-22

Seasons

References

External links
 BBC Hampshire article on Portsmouth FC Ladies
 Official website of Portsmouth FC and Portsmouth FC Ladies
 Portsmouth FC Ladies Facebook page

 
Ladies
Women's football clubs in England
1987 establishments in England
FA Women's National League teams